The 1972 Indiana gubernatorial election was held on November 7, 1972. 

Although during the same election cycle Indiana voters approved a constitutional amendment allowing the governor to serve in office for eight out of 12 years, incumbent Republican Governor Edgar Whitcomb was term-limited due to having been elected under the prior version of the constitution.

Republican nominee, Speaker of the Indiana House of Representatives Otis Bowen defeated Democratic nominee Former Governor (1961-1965) Matthew E. Welsh with 56.77% of the vote.

Nominations
Until 1976, all nominations for statewide office in Indiana were made by state conventions.

Democratic nomination

Results
Matthew E. Welsh, former Governor def.
Larry A. Conrad, Secretary of State

Republican nomination

Results

General election

Results

Governor

Lieutenant governor

References

Bibliography
 
 
 

1972
Indiana
Gubernatorial
November 1972 events in the United States